The 1954 Auburn Tigers football team represented Auburn University in the 1954 college football season. It was the Tigers' 63rd overall and 22nd season as a member of the Southeastern Conference (SEC). The team was led by head coach Ralph "Shug" Jordan, in his fourth year, and played their home games at Cliff Hare Stadium in Auburn and Legion Field in Birmingham, Alabama. They finished with a record of eight wins and three losses (8–3 overall, 3–3 in the SEC) and with a victory over Baylor in the Gator Bowl.

Schedule

Source: 1954 Auburn football schedule

References

Auburn
Auburn Tigers football seasons
Gator Bowl champion seasons
Auburn Tigers football